Mark Alan Roberts (born 16 October 1983) is an English former professional footballer who played as a defender.

Roberts started his career at Crewe Alexandra at the age of 11, and progressed through the club's academy; signing a professional contract at the age of 19. He played six times during his seven years for Crewe's first team, and was sent out on loan six times during his spell at the club. Following a loan spell at his hometown club, Northwich Victoria, he joined the club on a permanent basis in 2007. Roberts played 20 games for the Cheshire club during the second half of the 2006–07 season, before returning to the Football League with Accrington Stanley in summer 2007. He played 37 games for the club, before being loaned back to Northwich Victoria, a move which was later made permanent.

During the 2008–09 season, Roberts joined Stevenage on an initial one-month loan agreement, before signing permanently in January 2009 for an undisclosed fee. That season, he was part of the team that won the FA Trophy in May 2009. Roberts was made team captain ahead of the 2009–10 season, a season in which Roberts would help lead the team to the Football League for the first time in the club's history. The following season, the club earned back-to-back promotions following their sixth-place finish and subsequent League Two play-off victory in May 2011. He also spent two spells as caretaker manager of the club, once in January 2012 and again in March 2013.

After a successful four-and-a-half-year spell at Stevenage, Roberts joined Fleetwood Town on a free transfer in July 2013. He captained Fleetwood to promotion via the play-offs during his first season with the club. After two seasons at Fleetwood, Roberts joined League Two club Cambridge United in May 2015, where he spent two seasons. He subsequently spent the 2017–18 season at fellow League Two club Forest Green Rovers, before signing for Warrington Town of the Northern Premier League in August 2018. Roberts captained Warrington as they won the Northern Premier League play-offs in his first season there, although the club would ultimately be defeated in the step three super play-off final. He made 144 appearances over four years at Warrington, before announcing his retirement from playing in June 2022.

Early life
Born in Northwich, Cheshire, Roberts also grew up in Cheshire. He was a season ticket holder at Old Trafford during his childhood years, where he sat in the Stretford End supporting Manchester United. Roberts started playing football for his local team Northwich Town at the age of seven.

Career

Early career
Roberts signed for Crewe Alexandra at the age of 11. After progressing through the club's academy, he signed a professional contract with the club on 6 July 2003 at the age of 19. Roberts signed for Northern Premier League Division One club Leek Town on a two-month loan agreement in November 2003. He made his debut in the club's 3–1 victory over Lincoln United on 22 November 2003. Roberts scored his first goal in senior football in Leek's 2–1 home defeat to Kidsgrove Athletic on 26 December 2003. He played 10 times during the loan spell, scoring two goals. A week after returning to Crewe from his loan spell at Leek, Roberts was loaned out once again, this time joining Vauxhall Motors of the Northern Premier League Premier Division. He made his debut in a 3–2 victory at home to Southport on 31 January 2004. His first goal came in a 2–0 home victory over Alfreton Town on 6 March 2004, and finished the loan with 19 appearances, scoring three goals, before the end of the 2003–04 season.

Roberts impressed for Crewe in several pre-season friendlies before the 2004–05 season, and played his first full 90 minutes for the club in Crewe's 2–1 friendly win against Everton. Roberts' pre-season performances led to Crewe assistant manager, Neil Baker, saying "Mark's a player that I felt could bridge the gap, having worked with him more than the other coaches. The way he coped should give him the belief to go on now." He subsequently made his Crewe debut in September 2004, starting in a League Cup match against Sunderland, a game that Crewe won 4–2 in a penalty shoot-out after playing out a 3–3 draw after extra time. He made his Football League debut for Crewe in a 1–0 defeat at Preston North End on 25 September 2004, and made five more appearances before his run was curtailed by injury.

After struggling to establish himself at Crewe Alexandra, Roberts joined Merseyside based club Southport on loan. Roberts made his Southport debut in a 4–0 away defeat to Accrington Stanley on 26 November 2005. He played six games for Southport, before joining Chester City on a one-month loan agreement. Roberts started one game for Chester in a 5–0 defeat at Carlisle United, and did not play again for the Cheshire club subsequent to this match. After his loan spell at Chester, Roberts was loaned out to Southport for a second time in March 2006, making his second debut for the club in a 2–1 victory away to Forest Green Rovers, in which he was sent off in the 88th-minute for two bookable offences. He played 12 times during his second loan spell at the club, playing his final game in Southport's 1–0 home defeat to  Aldershot Town in April 2006. Despite still being under contract at Crewe, Roberts had not made a first-team appearance for the club since 2004 and was again loaned out ahead of the 2006–07 season, this time to Conference National club Halifax Town. He played his first game for Halifax in the club's first game of the 2006–07 season, starting in a 2–0 away defeat to Oxford United. He scored his first goal for Halifax in a 2–1 victory over Cambridge United, the first goal of the game. Roberts played 13 matches for Halifax, scoring once, before his loan agreement concluded.

Roberts joined his hometown club Northwich Victoria on another loan deal on 3 January 2007. He made his debut for Northwich in a 3–1 away victory at St Albans City at Clarence Park, and after playing in three matches, signed for the club on a permanent basis. He played regularly during the second half of the 2006–07 season, which saw an up-turn in form for Northwich. Roberts returned to the Football League with Accrington Stanley on 3 July 2007, joining the club for a fee set by a tribunal. He started the first 30 games for the League Two club, whilst playing in a further three as a substitute. He returned to Northwich Victoria on loan on 28 March 2008, on a one-month agreement. He helped Northwich to Conference Premier safety towards the end of the season, scoring his only goal in a match against fellow relegation candidates Stafford Rangers on 5 April 2008, and played nine times during the loan spell. Despite making a further appearance for Accrington towards the end of the season, Roberts re-joined Northwich on a permanent deal after his loan spell. During the 2008–09 season, Roberts continued to play regularly in the centre of Northwich's defence, scoring once in a 3–2 home defeat against Weymouth in September 2008. He made 20 appearances for Northwich during the first three months of the season.

Stevenage

Roberts started for Northwich in a 1–1 draw at Broadhall Way in a match between Northwich and Stevenage Borough on 15 November 2008, and he subsequently joined the Hertfordshire club on loan a week after the match. After impressing Stevenage manager Graham Westley during his one-month loan agreement, Roberts signed for the club on a permanent basis. He scored his first Stevenage goal in a 2–0 FA Trophy victory away to Farnborough on 14 January 2009. Roberts scored his first league goal for the club in a 2–1 victory away to Altrincham on 28 February 2009, scoring a stoppage time goal to give Stevenage the victory at Moss Lane. Roberts continued to play regularly as Stevenage made the play-offs as a result of finishing in the final play-off place. He scored in the semi-final first leg against Cambridge United, with a header from Steve Morison's ball across goal, as Stevenage would go on to lose 4–3 on aggregate over the two legs. Roberts was awarded Stevenage's Player of the Year at the end of the season. He also started in all seven of the club's successful FA Trophy run during that season, scoring twice and playing in the team's 2–0 victory against York City in the Final on 9 May 2009. In May 2009, Roberts was named as Stevenage team captain for the 2009–10 season. On Roberts' appointment as captain, Westley stated "Roberts is a natural leader who leads in the best way – by example. He is the obvious choice."

Roberts scored his first goal of the 2009–10 season on his 50th appearance for the club, giving Stevenage the lead in a 3–1 victory over Salisbury City on 17 October 2009. He captained the team in their 2–0 victory against Kidderminster Harriers at Aggborough on 17 April 2010; the match that secured promotion to the Football League for the first time in the club's history. Roberts played 49 times during the season, scoring five times from defence. He was also named as the Conference Premier Player of the Month for April 2010. During the season, Roberts formed a centre-back partnership with Jon Ashton, with Stevenage having the best defensive record in the league, conceding 24 goals in 46 league matches. The team ended the season having not conceded in their last six games; and conceded two goals in their last 15 league matches. In May 2010, Roberts signed a new two-year contract with Stevenage. On signing the new deal, Roberts said "there was never any doubt that I wanted to stay here, I love the club and love the fans. It will be a privilege to lead the team in the Football League". At the Football Conference's Annual Presentation Dinner, he was named in the Team of the Year, alongside fellow Stevenage defenders Ronnie Henry and Scott Laird.

Roberts captained the team in the club's first match in the Football League at the beginning of the 2010–11 season, playing the whole game in a 2–2 home draw with Macclesfield Town. He scored his first goal of the season in Stevenage's 3–0 away victory at local rivals Barnet on 2 November 2010. He scored twice against Macclesfield Town on 26 March 2011, taking his goal tally for the season to five goals. Roberts scored his sixth goal of the season, his highest seasonal goal tally during his three years at Stevenage, in the club's 2–2 draw at Stockport County on 9 April 2011. The goal, a half-volley at the back post, gave Stevenage a brief lead in the match just after half-time. Stevenage faced one of Roberts' former employers, Accrington Stanley, in the 2010–11 League Two play-off semi-finals as a result of the club's sixth-place finish. Roberts played in both games, which Stevenage won by a 3–0 aggregate scoreline. He captained the team at Old Trafford for the final against Torquay United on 28 May 2011, playing the whole match as Stevenage went on to win 1–0. This meant that Roberts had captained the club to back-to-back promotions, earning a place in League One for the first time in their history. Stevenage also had the best defensive record in League Two during the 2010–11 season, conceding 45 goals. That season, Stevenage progressed to the FA Cup Fourth Round, with Roberts playing in all five matches, including the club's 3–1 home victory against Premier League club Newcastle United. Roberts made 52 appearances in all competitions throughout the season, scoring six times.

Roberts captained the team in their match in League One to start the 2011–12 season, a 0–0 draw against Exeter City on 6 August 2011. He signed a two-year contract extension with the club on 26 August 2011. Two weeks later, Roberts scored his first competitive goal of the season in Stevenage's 1–1 away draw against Oldham Athletic on 10 September 2011. Roberts' goal came in the fourth minute of the match, heading in Michael Bostwick's shot to give Stevenage the lead. His second goal of the season came in the club's exit from the Football League Trophy on 4 October, with Roberts scoring a 20-yard volley in injury-time to take the game to penalties, which Stevenage subsequently lost 4–3. He described the volley as "easily the best goal of his career". Following Graham Westley's departure to Preston North End on 13 January 2012, Roberts was made player-manager for Stevenage's away match to Rochdale on 14 January 2012, with the club securing a 5–1 victory at Spotland. He remained in the position for two further matches, a 1–1 draw at Scunthorpe United, and a 4–2 home victory against Milton Keynes Dons, until the appointment of manager Gary Smith allowed Roberts to concentrate on the playing side of the game. He scored in successive games towards the latter stages of the season; a late equaliser against Preston North End, as well as the fifth goal in the club's 6–0 away victory against Yeovil Town on 14 April 2012. Roberts played every minute of Stevenage's 56 games during the season, scoring seven goals from defence, with the club losing out in the play-off semi-finals. Stevenage also progressed to the Fifth Round of the FA Cup that season, the furthest the club had reached in the competition; with Roberts playing in all six cup matches, including two matches against Tottenham Hotspur as the team took the Premier League club to a replay. He was also named as Stevenage's Player of the Year at the end of the season, becoming only the third player to win the award twice.

In the summer of 2012, Stevenage stated that they had rejected several bids for Roberts, along with fellow Stevenage centre-back Jon Ashton, from League One club Doncaster Rovers. He captained the team in Stevenage's first game of the 2012–13 season, scoring the third goal in a 3–1 victory against AFC Wimbledon in the League Cup on 14 August 2012. Two days after the game, Stevenage released a statement announcing they would not be selling Roberts during the season. Roberts scored his first league goal of the season in Stevenage's 4–1 defeat to Sheffield United at Bramall Lane, scoring an equaliser just before half-time, heading in Filipe Morais's corner. In February 2013, Roberts was one of three players shortlisted by the Football League for the Player in the Community award as a result of his work in the local community over the past few years. The club stated – "we are extremely proud that Mark has been shortlisted for this award, he is a credit to the football club and his day to day work and support of the community scheme and the club's community work is due worthy recognition". Following the departure of manager Gary Smith in March 2013, Roberts was again appointed as caretaker manager while the club searched for a new manager. He managed the team for Stevenage's televised away match against Tranmere Rovers, which ended in a 3–1 defeat on 24 March 2013. In Stevenage's next match, on 29 March 2013, Roberts scored a first-half header in a 1–1 away draw with Crawley Town, briefly giving Stevenage the lead with the team having to play with 10 men for most of the match following Miguel Comminges' early red card. In what was his last match in caretaker charge, Roberts stated he was "proud of the phenomenal performance", and that "the attitude, the way the lads reacted to the adversity we faced was probably something I haven't seen all season, to that level anyway". A day later, Graham Westley was re-appointed as Stevenage manager, who brought Roberts to the club in 2008, and as a result Roberts was able to concentrate solely on his playing role. He played 48 times during the season, scoring four goals. During his four-and-a-half-year spell at Stevenage, Roberts made 239 appearances in all competitions, an appearance record that places him sixth on the club's all-time appearance list, and scored 27 goals.

Fleetwood Town
Following the expiry of his contract at Stevenage, rejecting the club's offer of a new contract, Roberts signed for League Two club Fleetwood Town on a free transfer on 3 July 2013. On joining Fleetwood, Roberts stated – "I was massively impressed with this club from the first moment. Joining Fleetwood is an exciting prospect and I jumped at the chance after seeing the plans and hearing the chairman's vision". Shortly before the start of the 2013–14 season, Roberts was named as Fleetwood's new captain, stating it was a "massive honour to be named as club captain for the season". He scored six minutes into his Fleetwood debut, also the first League Two goal of the new season, with a header in a 3–1 home victory against Dagenham & Redbridge. As a result of Fleetwood's fourth-place finish in League Two, the club competed in the League Two play-offs. Roberts played in all three matches, with the team keeping three consecutive clean sheets, as Fleetwood won promotion to League One for the first time in the club's history after a 1–0 victory over Burton Albion at Wembley Stadium in the final. Roberts made 45 appearances in all competitions during his first season with the club, scoring three goals.

He remained at Fleetwood for the club's first season in League One, starting the season playing a peripheral role, featuring in just one match in the opening two months of the season. Roberts made his first league appearance of the season on 4 October 2014, playing the whole match as Fleetwood secured a 1–0 win against Port Vale at Highbury Stadium. After playing the whole 90 minutes in a 1–0 away win at Yeovil Town, he was a regular in the starting line-up for the remainder of the season. Similarly to a year earlier, he scored in an away victory at Rochdale, scoring a header from Stephen Dobbie's free-kick in a 2–0 win on 28 December 2014. On the final day of the regular season, he scored Fleetwood's second goal in the club's 2–1 victory against Port Vale on 3 May 2015, with Roberts scoring from a yard out after David Ball centred Josh Morris' cross. The game was Roberts' final game for Fleetwood, as the club consolidated their place in League One after finishing in 10th place. He made 72 appearances for Fleetwood in all competitions over his two years with the club, scoring six times. Roberts was released by Fleetwood upon the expiry of his contract in May 2015, one of 14 first team players to be released, with Fleetwood manager Graham Alexander stating the club's "drive had shifted to focus on youth development".

Cambridge United
Roberts joined League Two club Cambridge United on 25 May 2015, signing a two-year deal. He was named as the club's captain, a position he had previously held at both Stevenage and Fleetwood Town. Roberts made his debut for Cambridge on the opening day of the 2015–16 season, playing the full 90 minutes as Cambridge defeated Newport County 3–0 at the Abbey Stadium. He scored his first goal for the club in a 2–2 draw at York City on 3 October 2015, scoring from close range as Cambridge fought back from two goals down to earn a point. A week later, Roberts was sent-off for violent conduct in Cambridge's 3–1 home defeat to Portsmouth. He was a regular starter for Cambridge up until the end of January 2016, when he was dropped ahead of an away match at Leyton Orient. He was subsequently replaced as captain by Luke Berry, with manager Shaun Derry stating "I've spoken to Mark and he's accepted it as a man. He'll respond in the right way because he's a leader of men". He made 34 appearances for Cambridge in his first season with the club, scoring twice.

Roberts remained at Cambridge for the 2016–17 season, making his first start a month into the new season, helping Cambridge earn their first victory of the season, 2–1 away at Newport County on 24 September 2016. Three days later, he scored the only goal of the game from close range after 65 minutes in a 1–0 win against Yeovil Town. The victory meant Cambridge moved off the bottom of the league table. Roberts' return to the first team coincided with an upturn in form for the team and he remained a regular in the starting line-up in the centre of defence for the following five months of the season. He scored his second goal of the season with a 92nd-minute equaliser in an eventual 4–2 extra-time FA Cup victory at Dover Athletic on 17 November 2016, with Roberts playing all four FA Cup games as Cambridge progressed to the Third Round and faced Leeds United live on BBC. His third goal of the season was a 93rd-minute winning goal in a 3–2 victory over Newport County in February 2017, scoring from a rebound in a game Cambridge had trailed by two goals. Roberts did not make an appearance beyond March 2017, and played 31 games during the season, scoring three times. At the end of the season, Cambridge announced their released and retained list, stating that Roberts had been placed on the transfer-list with a year remaining on his contract. Having made no appearances for Cambridge in the opening weeks of the 2017–18 season, Roberts' contract with the club was cancelled by mutual consent on 24 August 2017.

Forest Green Rovers
On the same day as his departure from Cambridge was announced, Roberts signed for fellow League Two club Forest Green Rovers on a one-year contract. He made his Forest Green debut on 26 August 2017, playing the whole match in a 5–1 away defeat to Colchester United. Despite initially being a regular in the centre of defence for Forest Green, Roberts did not play in the first team from the start of 2018, his last appearance for the club coming in a 2–0 defeat to Yeovil Town in the Football League Trophy on 9 January 2018. Having not played first-team football for four months, Roberts left Forest Green upon the expiry of his contract in May 2018. He made 20 appearances during his time with Forest Green.

Warrington Town
Roberts joined Northern Premier League Premier Division club Warrington Town on a free transfer ahead of the 2018–19 season. He made his Warrington debut in the club's opening league match of the season, a 2–0 home defeat to Farsley Celtic. Roberts was appointed as club captain ahead of Warrington's next fixture away at Lancaster City, in what turned out to be their first victory of the season. He scored his first goal for Warrington in the club's 3–3 draw with Nantwich Town on 23 February 2019. Roberts played regularly throughout the season as Warrington finished the season in third place in the Northern Premier Division. He played in all of the club's three play-off fixtures, winning the Northern Premier Division play-offs, before losing 3–2 after extra-time to King's Lynn Town in the step three super play-off final on 11 May 2019. Roberts made 49 appearances during the season, scoring twice. He signed a one-year contract extension with Warrington on 24 May 2019. 

Roberts played regularly for Warrington during the 2019–20 and 2020–21 seasons, with both campaigns ultimately being curtailed due to the COVID-19 pandemic. Warrington were positioned in third and fourth place respectively in the Northern Premier League Premier Division in each season at the time of suspension. He signed a new one-year contract to remain at Warrington on 9 July 2021, playing 47 times during the 2021–22 season as Warringon were defeated in the Northern Premier League play-off final at the end of that season. Roberts announced his retirement from playing on 20 June 2022.

Style of play
Described as a "commanding centre-back", Roberts was deployed in central defence throughout his career. Appointed as club captain at Stevenage, Fleetwood, Cambridge United and Warrington, his leadership skills have been highlighted as one of his main strengths. During his playing career, he was described as a "goalscoring threat" from set-pieces, having scored the majority of his goals from attacking free kick and corner kick set-pieces.

Personal life
Roberts studied professional sports writing and broadcasting at Staffordshire University, graduating in 2012. He continued his studies after graduating from university, gaining two further football-based business qualifications at the Sports Business Institute. Roberts has stated he has a keen interest in "what goes on behind the scenes" in football, particularity at boardroom level, gaining his ACGP accreditation after enrolling himself in a corporate governance programme. He completed a Master of Business Administration degree at the University of Salford in 2020, with the degree focussed on CEOs in sport. Roberts is a personal development mentor for League Football Education (LFE), where he is mentoring first-year apprentices at six professional clubs.

Career statistics

A.  The "Other" column constitutes appearances and goals in the FA Trophy, EFL Trophy, English Football League play-offs and Northern Premier League play-offs.

Honours
Stevenage
FA Trophy: 2008–09; runner-up: 2009–10
Conference Premier: 2009–10
League Two play-offs: 2010–11

Fleetwood Town
League Two play-offs: 2013–14

Warrington Town
Northern Premier League Premier Division play-offs: 2018–19; runner-up: 2021–22
Step Three Super play-offs runner-up: 2018–19

Individual
Stevenage Player of the Year: 2008–09, 2011–12
Conference Premier Team of the Year: 2008–09, 2009–10
Conference Premier Player of the Month: April 2010
Northern Premier League Premier Division Team of the Year: 2018–19

References

External links

1983 births
Living people
Sportspeople from Northwich
English footballers
Association football defenders
Crewe Alexandra F.C. players
Leek Town F.C. players
Vauxhall Motors F.C. players
Southport F.C. players
Chester City F.C. players
Halifax Town A.F.C. players
Northwich Victoria F.C. players
Accrington Stanley F.C. players
Stevenage F.C. players
Fleetwood Town F.C. players
Cambridge United F.C. players
Forest Green Rovers F.C. players
Warrington Town F.C. players
English Football League players
National League (English football) players
Northern Premier League players
English football managers
Stevenage F.C. managers
English Football League managers